Seaview, a fictional nuclear submarine, was the setting for the 1961 motion picture Voyage to the Bottom of the Sea, starring Walter Pidgeon, and later for the 1964–1968 ABC television series of the same title. In the film, Seaview fires a ballistic missile with a nuclear warhead to extinguish the Van Allen belt that was set on fire by a space cataclysm.

Historical background

The accomplishments of America's nuclear-powered submarines were major news items in the years before the film Voyage to the Bottom of the Sea was released. Voyage to the Bottom of the Sea was the third American science fiction film to feature such ships. The first two were It Came from Beneath the Sea (1955) and The Atomic Submarine (1960).

The submarine , commissioned in 1954, was the first nuclear-powered ship of any kind. In August 1958, she steamed under the Arctic ice cap to make the first crossing from the Pacific to the Atlantic via the North Pole. On 3 August 1958 she became the first ship to reach the North Pole.

On 17 March 1959, the nuclear submarine  became the first submarine to surface at the North Pole. While at the Pole, her crew scattered the ashes of Arctic explorer Sir Hubert Wilkins.

The film Voyage to the Bottom of the Sea begins with Seaview in the Arctic on the final phase of her sea trials, which include a dive under the Arctic ice cap. 
  
 was commissioned on 20 December 1959 as America's first nuclear-powered ballistic missile submarine (SSBN). On 20 June 1960, she made the first two submerged launches of the Polaris missile. She got underway on the first deterrent patrol on 15 November 1960.

Two milestones in underwater exploration were achieved in 1960, the year before the film Voyage to the Bottom of the Sea was released.

From February 16, 1960, to May 10, 1960, the submarine  made the first submerged circumnavigation of the world. Triton observed and photographed Guam extensively through her periscope during this mission, without being detected by the U.S. Navy on Guam.

In the film, Seaview's voyage to the firing point follows much of the same track that Triton took on her circumnavigation: south through the Atlantic Ocean, around Cape Horn, and then northwest across the Pacific Ocean to the firing point near Guam. Seaview's bow and stern are radically different from Triton's, but Seaview's long, slim hull resembles the hull of Triton.

On January 23, 1960, Jacques Piccard and Lieutenant Don Walsh (USN), in the bathyscaphe Trieste, made the first descent to the bottom of the Challenger Deep. The Challenger Deep is the deepest surveyed spot in the world's oceans, and is located in the Mariana Trench, southwest of Guam.

History

For the motion picture version, scientist Admiral Harriman Nelson (USN-Ret) (Walter Pidgeon) was the designer/builder of the Seaview, operated under the auspices of the Bureau of Marine Exploration, United States Dept. of Science (per art director Herman Blumenthal).

In the context of the television series, the Seaview was one of several experimental submarines designed by Admiral Nelson (Richard Basehart), Director of the Nelson Institute of Marine Research, a top-secret government complex located in Santa Barbara, California, in the then-future years between 1973 and 1983. Seaview had two sister ships depicted in the television series, the Neptune (a variant of the same class as the Seaview destroyed late in the first season), and the virtually identical Angler (featured in the episode The Enemies). The Polidor, which was a prototype attack sub, was destroyed in the third episode of the series.

Seaview was prefixed "USOS" only in the 1961 film. The prefix "USOS" is spoken in a news report about the ship during the first minutes of the film, and when the ship's radio operator tries calling Washington, D.C. In Theodore Sturgeon's novelization of the film, "USOS" stood for United States Oceanographic Survey.

In the television series, the name Seaview was usually prefixed "S.S.R.N." (see below). Later writings explained that "SSRN" stood for Nuclear Submarine (SSN), Research (R) or SSRN, and was referred to by Admiral Nelson in at least one episode as "S.S.N.R. Seaview." However, in the pilot episode, "Eleven Days to Zero" (see below), Seaview's new commanding officer opens sealed orders addressed to "Commander Lee B. Crane, U.S.S. Seaview".

In the United States Navy, the hull classification symbol "SSRN" (without periods) would indicate a nuclear-powered radar picket submarine. Seaview was nuclear-powered, but no indication was ever given that she was equipped for radar picket missions. The hull classification symbol of a U.S. Navy ship is never written with periods after the letters. For example, the hull number of USS Triton (the only nuclear-powered radar picket submarine ever built for the United States Navy) is always written "SSRN-586", never "S.S.R.N.-586." There are at least six episodes of the series that show "S.S.R.N." written with the periods:
In "The Ghost of Moby Dick" (season 1, episode 14), "S.S.R.N. Seaview" appears in two places in the Observation Room: a name plate on the starboard bulkhead and a plan of the ship on the port bulkhead.
In "Cradle of the Deep" season 1, episode 25)  the name plate appears again showing "S.S.R.N. Seaview".  In addition, the plate indicates that her keel was laid on September 15 (year uncertain), and that she was commissioned on July 26, 1973.
In "The Creature" (season 1 episode 28), "S.S.R.N. Seaview" appears in the Observation Room, over guest star Leslie Nielsen's shoulder.
 In "Deadly Waters" (season 3, episode 7) we see the plaque yet again very clearly which clarifies the year her keel was laid and gives us a good view of the "ship's motto".
In "The Deadly Dolls" (season 4, episode 2), Professor Multiple (Vincent Price) studies the "Specifications of the S.S.R.N. Seaview" in Admiral Nelson's cabin, as he prepares to take over the ship.
In "Man of Many Faces" (season 4, episode 6), a crate addressed to "S.S.R.N. Seaview" is lowered by a crane into the Missile Room.

In the motion picture, Lee Crane (portrayed by Robert Sterling; originally the role was intended for David Hedison, who turned it down yet later accepted the same role for the television series) was the only Captain of the Seaview from its launch as "Nelson's Folly", as Congressman Llewellyn Parker (Howard McNear) described it. In the series, the first Captain of the Seaview was Commander John Phillips (portrayed by William Hudson). He was killed in "Eleven Days To Zero", which was the pilot episode of the series. Commander Lee Crane (David Hedison), on loan from the United States Navy, was picked to replace him. (Crane's rank was Commander, but he was usually addressed as "Captain" because he was the commanding officer of the ship.) Other crew included Executive Officer Lieutenant Commander Chip Morton (Robert Dowdell), Chief "Curley" Jones (Henry Kulky) (first season) and Chief  Sharkey (Terry Becker) (Season 2, 3 and 4). Crewman Kowalkski was played by Del Monroe, who played a similar character, "Kowski" in the feature film.

Design

The transparent-hull "window-section" bow of Seaview was not rounded like a traditional submarine but was faired into a pair of manta winglike, stationary bow planes (in addition to her more conventional sail planes). This was added after the original B-29-like front with twelve pairs of windows on two levels was modified for "Freudian anatomically analogous issues." In exterior shots, Seaview's bow had eight windows in the film and the first season of the television series, and four windows in seasons two through four of the series. The interior shots always showed only four windows although it did indeed imply two levels in the feature's scene with the giant octopus attack. Also in seasons two through four of the TV version, a pair of sliding metal "crash doors" shut across the face of the bow's observation deck to protect the four-window transparent surface in emergencies. In Theodore Sturgeon's novelization of the film, the windows are described as "... oversized hull plates which happen to be transparent." "They are incredibly strong because they are made of "X-tempered herculite", a top secret process developed by Nelson. To avoid a claustrophobic feeling during viewing of the 1961 feature film, Seaview’s interior was considerably more spacious and comfortable than any real military submarine. This was further enlarged when the Flying Sub was added to the miniatures with an even more open set for the control room interior.

The stern had unconventional, lengthy, V-shape planes above the twin engine area. On the original Seaview design, a single, central skeg rudder was specified, as well as two trailing edge control surfaces similar to an aircraft V-tail; a combination elevator-rudder or "ruddervator" fitted to the Beechcraft Bonanza and other aircraft.  But on the filmed miniatures, the 8-foot-7-inch (103-inch; 262-centimeter) miniature had three rudders: one behind each nacelle and on the rearmost portion of the skeg (see "The Ghost of Moby Dick"). This functional skeg rudder was only fitted to the  miniature and non-operationally inferred on the  miniature and not at all on the  version, which had a fixed skeg.

Weapons
In both the film and the series, Seaview was armed with torpedoes and nuclear ballistic missiles. The series added anti-aircraft missiles to Seaview's armory. They were called "interceptor missiles" in the pilot episode, and "sea-to-air missiles" in the episode "Terror" (season 4, episode 10).

In seasons two through four of the series, the forward searchlight also housed a laser beam that could be used against hostile sea life or enemy vessels.

Seaview was also capable of electrifying the outer hull, to repel attacking sea life that were trying to destroy the ship. In the episode "Mutiny" (season 1, episode 18), Crane ordered the "attack generators" made ready to use this capability on a giant jellyfish.

Lastly, Seaview  was outfitted with an "ultrasonic" weapon capable of causing another submarine to implode, though special authorization was normally required to utilize it. ("The Death Ship", Season 2, Ep 22)

Defenses
Seaview′s hull was partially protected by an "electronic defense field". ("Rescue", Season 2, Ep 9) Additionally, in the film, when Seaview is attacked by another submarine, Admiral Nelson advises Captain Crane to dive into the Mariana Trench to escape, claiming that Seaview is the only submarine that can survive the pressure inside the trench. The attacking sub is crushed by the pressure when it follows Seaview into the trench.

Propulsion system and speed
Although never stated, it was implied that Seaview used some kind of aquatic jet engine, generally similar to the turbo-pumpjet engine developed by Tom Swift, Jr.  or the later magnetohydrodynamic engine used in the fictional submarine Red October.  This might possibly explain her speed (very fast for a submarine) and her penchant for dramatic emergency surfacing. The episode "A Time to Die" (season 4, episode 11) begins with Seaview being struck by a vibration from an unknown source. Nelson says, "I'd say it was a drive shaft bearing, if we used propellers." However, this contradicts an earlier episode: in "The Creature" (season 1, episode 28) the engine room reports that "drive shafts to the propellers are jammed." In the episode "Hail to the Chief" (season 1, episode 16), Seaview runs submerged at 40 knots from Norfolk, Virginia, to the Virgin Islands.

In the episode "The Ghost of Moby Dick," Dr. Walter Bryce (Edward Binns) says, "I thought these nuclear submarines made better speed underwater," and Nelson agrees with him. In the episode "The Return of the Phantom," Lieutenant Commander Morton states that, "Every man who's ever served aboard a nuclear sub knows they make better time when they're submerged."

Whether a submarine is faster submerged or on the surface depends on her hull design, not her power plant. America's early nuclear submarines were slightly faster submerged than on the surface because their hulls were streamlined in accordance with the Greater Underwater Propulsion Power Program (GUPPY). An "Albacore hull", which Seaview did not have, is necessary for submerged speed to be significantly higher than surface speed. , the real-life submarine whose hull Seaview most nearly resembles, was slower when submerged than on the surface.

In Theodore Sturgeon's novelization of the film Voyage to the Bottom of the Sea, Seaview is faster on the surface than underwater: "...the Captain ...proceeded on the surface, where it was possible to squeeze another fifteen knots out of the big submarine."

In the series, there are many shots of Seaview running on the surface with the bow higher than the stern, and water splashing at the bottom of the bow. But there are also shots of her running on the surface and properly trimmed fore and aft – that is, the bow and stern are level. In these shots, the water flows up and over the bow, similar to a submarine with an Albacore hull (for an example, see the photo in the article USS Skipjack (SSN-585)). Therefore, it is possible that Seaview was faster submerged than on the surface. Such shots can be seen in the opening titles of the first season, and in the episodes "The Ghost of Moby Dick" and "Long Live the King" (season one episode 15). The episode "Hail to the Chief" (season one episode 16) has a shot of Seaview properly trimmed fore and aft, followed immediately by a shot of her with the bow higher than the stern.
 
Except where noted, the speed data below are from The Ships and Aircraft of the U.S. Fleet by Norman Polmar (12th edition, 1981, Naval Institute Press, Annapolis). Streamlined diesel-electric submarines are included for comparison with the nuclear-powered ships. 
 Tang class: The Tang class of diesel-electric submarines were the first American submarines designed to be faster submerged than on the surface. Surface speed: 15.5 knots; Submerged speed: 18.3 knots
 was an unarmed, diesel-electric submarine built to test a highly streamlined hull design. This Albacore hull was so successful that it became the standard hull design for American submarines. Surface speed: 15 knots; Submerged speed: 27.4 knots
  was the first nuclear-powered submarine, and the first nuclear-powered ship of any kind. Surface speed: 18 knots; Submerged speed: over 20 knots (Polmar, page 39).
 was the first American nuclear-powered submarine with an "Albacore hull". Surface speed: approximately 20 knots; Submerged speed: over 30 knots (Polmar, page 36)
 was designed and built for high speed surface operations as a radar picket submarine. Surface speed: 27 knots; Submerged speed: over 20 knots (Polmar, page 35)
They were also the only American combat submarines to combine diesel power and an "Albacore hull". Surface speed: 15 knots; Submerged speed: 25 knots (Polmar, page 40).

Refit and the Flying Sub
Between the TV version's first and second seasons, the Seaview miniatures were extensively revised. Dated May 1965, the drawings penned by William Creber (who also designed the Flying Sub itself) stated "modifications to be applied to all miniatures." The number of bow windows was reduced from eight on two levels of four each to a single row of four (actually two with a dividing girder.) This then matched the interior set with the exterior miniatures but with the added detrimental effects of a more bulbous frontal appearance and a reduction in apparent overall size of the vessel. The control room, previously located on an upper level, was moved forward on a lower level ahead of the conning tower, to connect directly with the observation room, and a large hangar bay was added to the bow, beneath the observation room/control room combination. This hangar held the  -wide and -long flying submersible, aptly called the "Flying Sub" or "FS-1", implying that there were several more back at the base, which would have to be the case since several Flying Subs were lost to mishaps or combat during the run of the show. Promotional materials published between the first and second seasons referred to it as the Flying Fish, but the name was evidently dropped prior to the start of filming and was never used in the show. It was deployed through bomb-bay-like doors. As it broke the surface, its engines could generate enough thrust for the vehicle to take off and fly at supersonic speeds. The Flying Sub was also nuclear-powered.

Production background
Three models of Seaview — a 1/8" to the foot 4 (51½"), a 1/4" to the foot 8.5 (103"), and a 1/2" to the foot 17 feet (206") (1.2, 2.4 and 5.5 m) long — version were built (eight-window nose in the motion picture and first television season, four-window version thereafter). The four-foot wood and steel tube approval/pattern model was extensively seen in the feature and on the TV series used as set decoration on a shelf in the observation nose, and behind Nelson's desk in his cabin. The eight-foot model had external doors for a not fitted nine-inch Flying Sub, while a more detailed 18-inch Flying Sub was held within the larger Seaview. For close-ups, a three-foot Flying Sub was produced, which was also used in the aerial sequences. All three Seaview models were built for a total 1961 price of $200,000 by Herb Cheeks' model shop at Fox, and were filmed by L. B. Abbott who won two Emmy Awards for special effects in the series. For the television series a rather poorly rendered two-foot model was built.

The fates of the three original models vary; the original eight-window wood and steel four-foot display model was damaged in an altercation between writer Harlan Ellison and ABC Television executive Adrian Samish and after a full restoration resides in a private collection. There were at least two fiberglass cast "wet models" in this size all of which are now in private hands. One of the two eight-foot models was extensively modified; (bow cut off) for use in the short-lived series The Return of Captain Nemo (1978) and aside from the nose section, is believed to have been destroyed. The single 17-foot model sat in the Virginia Beach garage of model maker Dave Merriman (who built several of the miniatures for The Hunt for Red October movie) during most of the 1980s where it was modified from its original appearance. It then was displayed above the bar at the (now-defunct) Beverly Hills Planet Hollywood restaurant from 1993 to 2002 and after a partial restoration, is on display at the Museum Of Science Fiction located in Seattle, Washington. There were several miniatures of the Flying Sub and the mini-sub, and after a props and memorabilia auction in the late 1970s at 20th Century Fox most have found their way into private collections.

Model kits

Both the Seaview and Flying Sub have been represented by several model kits. Both were originally offered by Aurora Plastics Corporation back in the 1960s during the run of the show, and have been re-released several times. Moebius Models have recently issued versions of both the Seaview and Flying Sub, each in two differing scales. Though superior to the original kits from the 60's, these are still not entirely faithful to the contours and dimensions of the original miniatures.

See also
List of fictional ships

References 

Fictional submarines of the United States Navy
Fictional submarines